A Six-Man Tag Team Championship (or 6-Man Tag Team Championship) is a title in tag team wrestling held by 3 people and defended in a six-man tag team match. Titles of this nature include:

AEW World Trios Championship (2022-present)
Campeonato Mundial de Tercias AAA (2011-present)
Campeonato Mundial de Trios CMLL (1993-present)
FMW World Street Fight 6-Man Tag Team Championship (1996-1998 or 1999, 2015-2016)
HoPWF Six-Man Tag Team Championship (1999-2001)
KO-D 6-Man Tag Team Championship (2012-present)
Lucha Underground Trios Championship (2015-2018)
NEVER Openweight 6-Man Tag Team Championship (2015-present)
NWA World Six-Man Tag Team Championship (1955-1998)
Open the Triangle Gate Championship (2004-present)
ROH World Six-Man Tag Team Championship (2016-present)
WAR World Six-Man Tag Team Championship (1994-2000, 2010+ as Tenryu Project 6-Man Tag Team Championship)
WCW World Six-Man Tag Team Championship (1991)
WCWA World Six-Man Tag Team Championship (1982-1988)
WEW 6-Man Tag Team Championship (1999 to 2001 or 2002)